Nandan Mohanrao Nilekani (born 2 June 1955) is an Indian entrepreneur. He co-founded Infosys and is the non-executive chairman of Infosys replacing R Seshasayee and Ravi Venkatesan, who were the co-chairs of the board, on 24 August 2017. After the exit of Vishal Sikka, Nilekani was appointed as non-executive chairman of the board effective 24 August 2017.
He was the chairman of the Unique Identification Authority of India (UIDAI). After a successful career at Infosys, he headed the Government of India's technology committee, TAGUP. He is a member of Indian National Congress but not active in politics as of 2019.

Early life
Nandan Nilekani was born on 2 June 1955 at Bangalore, Karnataka. His parents Durga and Mohan Rao Nilekani are from Konkani brahmin community originally from Sirsi Karnataka. His father worked as a general manager of Mysore and Minerva Mills and subscribed to Fabian Socialist ideals that influenced Nilekani in his early years. Nilekani's elder brother, Vijay, works in the Nuclear Energy Institute in the USA.

Nilekani studied at the Bishop Cotton Boys' School and St. Joseph's High School Dharwad, Karnataka PU College Dharwad and received a bachelor's degree in electrical engineering from the Indian Institute of Technology Bombay, Mumbai.

Career

Information technology
In 1978 he started his career at the Mumbai-based Patni Computer Systems, where he met and was interviewed by N.R. Narayana Murthy. In 1981, Nilekani, Murthy, and five others left Patni to start their own company, Infosys. Nilekani became the chief executive officer of Infosys in March 2002 and served as CEO of the company through April 2007, when he relinquished his position to his colleague Kris Gopalakrishnan and became co-chairman of the board of directors. Before assuming leadership as CEO in 2002, Nilekani held various posts, including managing director, president, and chief operating officer. He served as its CEO from March 2002 to April 2007. During his five-year tenure as CEO, Infosys' topline grew sixfold to $3 billion.

In 2017 he returned to Infosys after the exit of CEO Vishal Sikka to become a chairman. Upon his return he changed  power centre from California back to its Bengaluru headquarters.
Also, such people as R. Seshasayee (a chairman and board director), Ravi Venkatesan (a co-chairman),  Sikka (executive vice chairman and director), and Jeffrey Lehman and John Etchemendy (directors) resigned from their posts.

Bureaucracy
Nilekani left Infosys in July 2009 to serve as the chairman of the Unique Identification Authority of India, a cabinet-ranking position that he entered under the invitation of Prime Minister Dr. Manmohan Singh. As chair of the UIDAI he was responsible for implementing the envisioned Multipurpose National Identity Card, or Unique Identity card (UID Card) project in India. This initiative aims to provide a unique identification number for all residents of India and will be used primarily as the basis for efficient delivery of welfare services. The identification method will be biometric, and the drive to create this government database of the entire population of India has been called "the biggest social project on the planet."

They developed Aadhaar, which is an Indian biometric ID system, a database, which contains demographic information, home addresses of Indians. In April 2017 1.14 billion Indian people got their ID number. In 2016, World Bank Chief Economist Paul Romer called Aadhaar “the most sophisticated ID programme in the world.” This program is criticized for violating people's privacy and exposing personal information.

He is a member of the board of governors of the Indian Council for Research on International Economic Relations (ICRIER) and the president of NCAER. He also sits on several advisory boards, including those of the World Economic Forum Foundation and the Bombay Heritage Fund.

Nilekani has appeared on The Daily Show with Jon Stewart to promote his book Imagining India: The Idea of a Renewed Nation  and spoke at a TED conference in 2009 on his ideas for India's future.

Politics
Nilekani joined Indian National Congress in March 2014 and contested from the Bangalore South constituency where he lost by  votes to BJP candidate Ananth Kumar in the 2014 Lok Sabha election.

In December 2016, he joined a committee to investigate how people in India could use digital payments to a greater extent.

General election 2014
According to news reports, he was the richest candidate for the 2014 Lok Sabha elections with declared assets worth Rs 7,710 crore in his affidavit filed before the Election Commission.

EkStep
Nilekani is chairman of EkStep, a non-profit literacy and numeracy platform. Set up by the Nilekanis with an initial commitment of $10 million (about Rs 65 crore), EkStep looks at solving the 'learning problem' by creating a technology-led platform to help children in improving their 'learning outcomes' quite early in their life. EkStep intends to do it using gamified apps, hosted in the Google Play Store.

NCAER 
Nilekani is president of the governing body of the New Delhi-based National Council of Applied Economic Research (NCAER), India’s largest and oldest non-profit economic research think tank.  NCAER, established in 1956, does grant-funded independent economic policy research and sponsored research studies for governments and industry. Its work covers almost all branches of economics, from economic forecasting to poverty analysis. NCAER is among a handful of think tanks globally that collect primary survey data on a scientific, national basis covering households, enterprises, consumers, and individuals. NCAER’s economic and social data sets are used widely for research and analysis on India.

Investments 
Nilekani is also a serial investor and he has invested in around 12 start-ups till date which includes: ShopX, Juggernaut, Mubble Networks, Fortigo, P2SME, RailYatri, Axiom Consulting, Systemantics India, Sedemac Mechatronics, Disha Medical Services, Tracxn, LetsVenture and TravelTriangle.

Charity
In 2017 Nandan and wife Rohini decided to donate 50 percent of their wealth to Giving Pledge, which is a movement organized by Bill Gates. The reason why they joined this movement was as following: "We see inequality is increasing sharply in most countries. We see the young and the restless in this interconnected globe, unsure of their future, wanting more but anticipating less."

He also donated money to rebuild the hostel campus of IIT Bombay.

In 2008 he also set up the Indian Institute for Human Settlements to help to solve urban challenges for India.

Personal life

Nilekani is married to Rohini Nilekani (née Soman), whom he met at a quizzing event at IIT. They have two children, Nihar and Janhavi, each of whom has received an undergraduate degree from Yale University. His first language is Konkani. In addition to Konkani, he speaks Kannada fluently along with English, Marathi, and Hindi. The Nilekani family has a 2.31 percent stake in Infosys as per the quarter ended March 2018.

Honours and awards

 He was awarded an honorary Doctor of Law degree by the Rotman School of Management at the University of Toronto on 31 May 2011.
He received NDTV Indian of the Year's Transformational Idea of the Year Award in 2011
 He was named Corporate Citizen of the Year at the Asia Business Leaders Award (2004) organised by CNBC.
 Joseph Schumpeter Prize for innovative services in economy, economic sciences and politics – 2005.
 In 2009, Time magazine placed Nilekani in the Time 100 list of 'World's Most Influential People'
 Was presented the 'Legend in Leadership Award' by the Yale University in November 2009. He is the first Indian to receive the top honour.
 In January 2006, Nilekani became one of the youngest entrepreneurs to join 20 global leaders on the World Economic Forum (WEF) Foundation Board.
 Nilekani was awarded one of India's highest civilian honours, the Padma Bhushan, in 2006.
 Also in 2006, he was named Businessman of the Year by Forbes Asia.
 India Today magazine ranked him 12th in India's 50 most powerful people of 2017 list.
 In 2017 he received the Lifetime Achievement Award from E & Y. CNBC- TV 18 conferred India Business leader award for outstanding contributor to the Indian Economy-2017.
 He received the 22nd Nikkei Asia Prize for Economic & Business Innovation 2017.
 Awarded Doctor of Science (Honoris Causa) by IIT Bombay during the Institute's 57th Convocation, in 2019.

Biography

References

External links

 
 
 About Nandan Mohan Nilekani

Living people
Businesspeople from Bangalore
Recipients of the Padma Bhushan in science & engineering
Indian billionaires
1955 births
IIT Bombay alumni
Bishop Cotton Boys' School alumni
Infosys people
Indian National Congress politicians
Giving Pledgers
21st-century philanthropists
Winners of the Nikkei Asia Prize